Ishiyama Tomohiro "Raoumaru" (born September 8, 1985) is a Japanese heavyweight kickboxer competing in RISE promotion.

Career
Raoumaru ended the 2012 year by competing in the sixteen-man 2012 Glory Heavyweight Grand Slam at Glory 4: Tokyo - 2012 Heavyweight Grand Slam in Saitama, Japan on December 31, 2012. Raoumaru lost the fight at the opening stage, Saki floored him twice in round one and forced the referee to stop the bout.

He challenged Nicolas Wamba for the vacant World Kickboxing Network Kickboxing Rules Super Heavyweight World Championship on 22 March 2014 in Agde, France at 11th Trophee de l’Ephebe event. Raoumaru lost the fight by TKO as the referee stopped the fight in round 2.

Titles
 2011 K-King Heavyweight Tournament Champion
 2010 RISE - Rising Rookies Cup Winner

Kickboxing record

References

1985 births
Living people
Japanese male kickboxers
Heavyweight kickboxers